Pseudapanteles is a genus of braconid wasps in the family Braconidae. There are more than 30 described species in Pseudapanteles. They are found primarily in the Neotropics, although three species are found in North America.

Species
These 36 species belong to the genus Pseudapanteles:

 Pseudapanteles abantidas (Nixon, 1965)
 Pseudapanteles alfiopivai Fernández-Triana & Whitfield, 2014
 Pseudapanteles alvaroumanai Fernández-Triana & Whitfield, 2014
 Pseudapanteles analorenaguevarae Fernández-Triana & Whitfield, 2014
 Pseudapanteles annulicornis Ashmead, 1900
 Pseudapanteles brunneus Ashmead, 1900
 Pseudapanteles carlosespinachi Fernández-Triana & Whitfield, 2014
 Pseudapanteles carlosrodriguezi Fernández-Triana & Whitfield, 2014
 Pseudapanteles christianafigueresae Fernández-Triana & Whitfield, 2014
 Pseudapanteles dignus (Muesebeck, 1938)
 Pseudapanteles gouleti Fernández-Triana, 2010
 Pseudapanteles hernanbravoi Fernández-Triana & Whitfield, 2014
 Pseudapanteles jorgerodriguezi Fernández-Triana & Whitfield, 2014
 Pseudapanteles josefigueresi Fernández-Triana & Whitfield, 2014
 Pseudapanteles laurachinchillae Fernández-Triana & Whitfield, 2014
 Pseudapanteles lipomeringis (Muesebeck, 1958)
 Pseudapanteles luisguillermosolisi Fernández-Triana & Whitfield, 2014
 Pseudapanteles margaritapenonae Fernández-Triana & Whitfield, 2014
 Pseudapanteles mariobozai Fernández-Triana & Whitfield, 2014
 Pseudapanteles mariocarvajali Fernández-Triana & Whitfield, 2014
 Pseudapanteles maureenballesteroae Fernández-Triana & Whitfield, 2014
 Pseudapanteles moerens (Nixon, 1965)
 Pseudapanteles munifigueresae Fernández-Triana & Whitfield, 2014
 Pseudapanteles nerion (Nixon, 1965)
 Pseudapanteles nigrovariatus (Muesebeck, 1921)
 Pseudapanteles oscarariasi Fernández-Triana & Whitfield, 2014
 Pseudapanteles ottonsolisi Fernández-Triana & Whitfield, 2014
 Pseudapanteles pedroleoni Fernández-Triana & Whitfield, 2014
 Pseudapanteles raulsolorzanoi Fernández-Triana & Whitfield, 2014
 Pseudapanteles renecastroi Fernández-Triana & Whitfield, 2014
 Pseudapanteles rodrigogamezi Fernández-Triana & Whitfield, 2014
 Pseudapanteles rosemarykarpinskiae Fernández-Triana & Whitfield, 2014
 Pseudapanteles ruficollis (Cameron, 1911)
 Pseudapanteles sesiae (Viereck, 1912)
 Pseudapanteles soniapicadoae Fernández-Triana & Whitfield, 2014
 Pseudapanteles teofilodelatorrei Fernández-Triana & Whitfield, 2014

References

Further reading

 
 
 

Microgastrinae